Nandi Madida née Mngoma (born 20 March 1988) is a South African singer, actress, model and television presenter. Born and raised in Maphumulo, KwaZulu-Natal, South Africa, She rose to stardom after she was featured  by DJ Franky as  a vocalist on single "Tonight", which was released  (2012).

Having signed  with Universal Music Group in 2011, Madida released  her self-titled debut studio  album Nandi (2012).

Life and career  
Madida was born in Maphumulo and was raised in Durban, KwaZulu-Natal. She went to Danville Park Girls High School, after finishing her matric she went to study law at UKZN and later to Varsity College, even though her initial plan was to pursue journalism. Madida has been a dancer and model since childhood. She won the Miss Junior RSA title when she was eight.

Career 

Her success in a talent search led to a position as a performer at the Gateway Mall in Umhlanga. In 2004, at the age of 15, she landed her first television job as host of the SABC2 pre-teen entertainment show called Bling, which mainly focused on music and movies.

2011-2013:Nandi
In 2011, she released her first single "Tonight". She later signed with Universal Music Group and released her self-titled debut studio album Nandi in 2012.

In 2013, she co-hosted alongside ProVerb and Dineo Ranaka in the Mzansi Magic Magazine programme All Access Mzansi.

In 2014, Nandi Madida and K.O released the song "Skhanda Love", it became an instant hit in and was eventually nominated for several music awards.

From 2015 to 2016, she played Zokuthula Dhlomo in the Mzansi Magic telenovela The Road. She co-hosted the e.tv reality series Coke Studio.

In September 2016, she and Ayanda Thabethe co-hosted the BET entertainment magazine show BET A-List.

Filmography 

 All Access Mzansi (2013) – Herself
 ScreenTime with Nicky Greenwall (2014) – Herself
 The Road (2015) – Zokuthula "Zoe" Dhlomo
 Code Green (2015) – Herself
 Coke Studio (2016) – Herself
 BET A-List (2016) – Herself
 Lip Sync Battle Africa (2017) – Herself
 The Next Brand Ambassador (2019) – Herself
 Black Is King (2020) – Nala

Discography

Solo studio albums

Singles

As lead artist

As featured artist

Awards and nominations

Personal life 
Nandi Madida is married to Zakhele Madida and they have two children.

References 

1988 births
Living people
Musicians from Durban
University of KwaZulu-Natal alumni